The Kelowna Chiefs are a junior "B" ice hockey team based in Kelowna, British Columbia, Canada. They are members of the Bill Ohlhausen Division of the Okanagan/Shuswap Conference of the Kootenay International Junior Hockey League (KIJHL). They play their home games at Rutland Arena.

History

Chase

The Chiefs were founded as the Chase Chiefs in 2007. They did not qualify for the playoffs in their opening season, finishing with a record of 26-20-5. The following year, they finished 25-23-4, qualifying for the playoffs, where they lost in the second round to the Sicamous Eagles. In the 2009-10 season, they finished with a record of 26-20-4, finishing third in the Okanagan Division. They defeated the Kamloops Storm in the opening round, 3-1, before bowing out to Revelstoke in the second. The 2009-10 season marked the end of the Chase Chiefs, however, as the franchise relocated to Rutland, in Kelowna for the 2010-11 season. In three seasons, the Chase Chiefs compiled a total record of 77-63-13. They were last coached by Brad Fox before the relocation. However, the town of Chase was awarded an expansion franchise for the KIJHL in 2011-12, only a year after the departure of the Chiefs. The Chase Heat joined the league along with the Summerland Steam in 2011-12.

Kelowna

The new Chiefs team played in Kelowna for the 2010-11 season, and finished with a record of 26-21-1-0-2 in their opening season, second in the Okanagan Division. They would lose in the second round of the playoffs, 4-0, to the Osoyoos Coyotes. In their second season, the Chiefs finished with an almost identical record, 26-22-0-0-4, finishing fourth in the Okanagan Division. They surprisingly played all the way to the league championship, before being swept 4-0 by the Beaver Valley Nitehawks. The following year, the Chiefs finished with a record of 35-15-1-0-1, first in the Okanagan Division. They were defeated, however, in the second round of the playoffs by Osoyoos again. In 2013-14, the Chiefs finished 2nd in the Okanagan Division, before losing in the first round to Osoyoos again. The next year, the Chiefs finished with a record of 23-24-2-0-2, 2nd in the Okanagan Division. They lost, however, in the first round again, this time to the Summerland Steam. The 2015-16 season was almost identical, with the Chiefs' compiling a record of 24-23-2-2-1, and losing in the first round again to Summerland.

Season-by-season record

Note: GP = Games played, W = Wins, L = Losses, T = Ties, OTL = Overtime Losses, Pts = Points, GF = Goals for, GA = Goals against

Records as of March 3, 2022.

Playoffs

References

External links
Official website of the Kelowna Chiefs

Ice hockey teams in British Columbia
Sport in Kelowna
2010 establishments in British Columbia
Ice hockey clubs established in 2010